This is a list of Serbian Orthodox Christian monasteries in Serbia and near areas (Montenegro, Bosnia and Herzegovina, Croatia, North Macedonia, and Kosovo), also Romania, Hungary, Greece, Germany, United States of America, Canada, and Australia.

Stauropegions 
There are two stauropegion monasteries in the Serbian Orthodox Church, that are directly subordinated to the Serbian patriarch:

Archeparchy of Belgrade and Karlovci 
Source:

Eparchy of Srem 
Source:

Eparchy of Banat 
Source:

Eparchy of Bačka

Eparchy of Šabac 
Source:

Eparchy of Valjevo 
Source:

Eparchy of Šumadija 
Source:

Eparchy of Vranje 
Source:

Eparchy of Timok 
Source:

Eparchy of Kruševac 
Source:

Eparchy of Žiča 
Source:

Eparchy of Niš 
Source: https://eparhijaniska.rs/manastiri

Eparchy of Braničevo

Eparchy of Mileševa 
Source:

In Serbia

In Montenegro

Eparchy of Ras and Prizren 
Source:

In Central Serbia

In Kosovo

Metropolitanate of Montenegro and the Littoral 
Source:

Eparchy of Budimlja and Nikšić 
Source:

Metropolitanate of Dabar and Bosnia 
Source:

Eparchy of Zvornik and Tuzla 
Source:

Eparchy of Bihać and Petrovac 
Source:

Eparchy of Banja Luka

Eparchy of Zahumlje and Herzegovina 
Source:

Metropolitanate of Zagreb and Ljubljana 
Source:

Eparchy of Osječko Polje and Baranja 
Source:

Eparchy of Slavonia 
Source:

Eparchy of Gornji Karlovac 
Source:

Eparchy of Dalmatia 
Source:

Eparchy of Timisoara

Eparchy of Buda 
Source:

Eparchy of Western Europe 
Source:

Others

Cave monasteries
There are several cave monasteries (built into mountains and caves) of the Serbian Orthodox Church, including those of the Holy Annunciation, Kovilje, Crna Reka, Gornjak, Hermitage of St. Peter Koriški, Kađenica, Lukovo, Rsovci, Savina, in Serbia, and Ostrog monastery, in Montenegro.

See also 
List of Russian Orthodox monasteries

Annotations

References

Sources

 
 
 
 
 
 
 
 
 
 
 
 
 
 
  
 
 
 
 
 
 
 
 
 
 

 

Lists of Christian monasteries
Monasteries
Lists of Christian monasteries in Serbia